Ahtahkakoop First Nation ( atâhkakohp, meaning Starblanket, name of the first chief of the Band) is a Cree First Nation band government in Shell Lake, Saskatchewan, Canada.  The Ahtahkakoop First Nation government and community is located on Ahtahkakoop 104, 72 kilometers northwest of Prince Albert and is 17,347 hectares in size. The community was formerly known as the "Sandy Lake Indian Band", a name which is still used interchangeably when referring to the reserve.

History
The name of this reserve originated from its first chief who was born about 1816 on the vast prairie region that was home to his people. He was named Ahtahkakoop, which in Cree means "Starblanket". He was a Head Chief of the Plains Cree. The plain buffalos were once the most important resource to Ahtahkakoop and his people. By 1860s, with the arrival of European settlers the buffalo disappeared rapidly. The chief understood that the ways of living that his band was used to needed to change in order to get through the crisis. To help his people transit from hunter and warrior to farmer a reservation is needed. In 1874 the chief invited Anglican missionary John Hines to settle with his people near Sandy Lake. On August 23, 1876, Chief Ahtahkakoop signed Treaty 6 at Fort Carlton, giving up their vast hunting territory in exchange for a 67-square-mile reserve and $5 a year “per head.” When the treaty was signed, the population of his band was 185 members. He wished to have a reserve adjoining Mistawasis on the Green Lake Trail at Sandy Lake given his band already had houses and gardens there. The reserve was surveyed in the summer and fall of 1878, but when the survey was completed the reserve was neither in the location nor of the size that had been advised to the surveyors. Chief Ahtahkakoop died on December 4, 1896, and Kamiyoastotin became chief. The land at Sandy Lake was fertile, and though the band suffered many hardships and setbacks, progress was made. The 1929 fall in market prices, followed by prolonged drought, forced people off reserve as they sought employment clearing land and helping on farms. The first church was built in 1874, and Reverend Hines started the first school in 1876. The band's infrastructure includes a school, workshop, warehouse, police station, RCMP residences, fire hall, health clinic, band hall, arena, gymnasium, daycare, the Lonesome Pine Convenience Store, the Indian Child and Family Services Agency, and the Cree Nations Treatment Centre. In 2000 the band-owned Ahtahkakoop Publishing Company published its first book, Atahkakoop: The Epic Account of a Cree Head Chief, His People, and Their Struggle for Survival, 1816–1896. Currently there are 2,706 registered members, with 1,440 people living on their 17,347-hectare reserve 72 km northwest of Prince Albert.  As of January 2003 the registered population of Ahtahkakoop is 2600 band members. The language spoken is Cree. The community was formerly known as "Sandy Lake Indian Band".

The Chief and Headmen who represented the Sandy Lake Indian Band at the signing of Treaty 6 in Fort Carlton were:

 Chief Ah-tuh-uk-koop (Star Blanket)
 Sah-Sah-Koo-Moos (Adherer)
 Benjamin (Thigh)
 Mee-Now-Ah-Chahk-Way (Good Spirit)
 Kee-Sik-Ow-Asis (Sky Child)

Reserve

Ahtahkakoop 104 (2006 population 1,101) is a Cree First Nations reserve in Shell Lake, Saskatchewan, Canada. It is one of the few settlements in Saskatchewan where the population is increasing in number. Between 2001 and 2006, according to the census, the reserve grew by 0.2%, or 2 people. The current population of all the settlements is 1,924th out of 5,008. Geographically, it is enclaved within the rural municipality of Canwood No. 494.

Geography and environment 
Ahtahkakoop Cree Nation's reserve is registered as Ahtahkakoop Indian Reserve NO.104. Ahtahkakoop Cree Nation joined the Reserve Land and Environmental Management Program and First Nation Land Management Act in 2015. Government is increasing the land holdings to pursue land development opportunities. While traditional lands and cultural sites are protected from development.

Government 
First Nations Elections Act is the election system used by Ahtahkakoop Cree Nation. Average length of time served in role of chief and council members is approximately 8 years. Every year two General Band Meetings will be held.  Ahtahkakoop Cree Nation's General Assessment Score (2015-2016) is 10.3. Compared with 2012 the score decreased by 4.5. The percentage of eligible voters among the nation is 44.8% in 2017. Following is the table of current officials.

Current Officials 

The current government priorities are as follows:

 Improve communication between leadership and membership.
 Develop a Treaty 6 position paper.
 Establish bylaws and develop policies that govern community operations.
 Develop policies to enhance community wellbeing.
 Create a data management system.

First Nations Financial Transparency Act (FNFTA): https://fnp-ppn.aadnc-aandc.gc.ca/fnp/Main/Search/FederalFundingMain.aspx?BAND_NUMBER=406&lang=eng

Demographics 
In 2016 there are about 2,706 registered and 1,440 on-reserve registered population in Ahtahkakoop Cree Nation. Around 48.9% people live on the reserve. From 2010 to 2016 the on-reserve average annual population growth rate is 2.0%. On reserve the male-female ratio is about 1 to 1. Percentage for age group under 15 (27.2%), between 15 and 24 (19.9%), 25 to 64 (48,0%) and above 65 (5.0%). The average age for the registered population is 29.2. The population density is 11.4 persons per km^2

The following table is for the registered population in April 2022

Language 
In 2016 there are about 1,475 people who know certain language. Around 380 people know how to speak Indigenous language and around 1,470 people know English. 20.0% of the population learned Indigenous languages first. 20.0% of the population speak indigenous language at home. About 25.8% of the people can understand indigenous language.

Education 
The education authority of Ahtahkakoop Cree Nation is the Treaty 6 Education Council. About 734 students  are enrolled in elementary and secondary school, and about 159 post-secondary students are enrolled. 41.3% aboriginal identity population aged 15 years and over received a high school diploma or equivalent. While 24.9% of the aboriginal identity population received a postsecondary certificate, diploma or degree. 99% of the teacher are from First Nation, and 80% of them have been teaching on-reserve for at least 5 years. High school graduation rate is near 45%. The government is working to ensure Treaty teachings are delivered in all classrooms from Kindergarten to Grade 12. More financial funding will be attributed to education. Formal education, lifelong learning, and employment development are stressed to assist the people in meeting their maximum potential. The education database is under construction.

Notable people
 Chief Ahtahkakoop, a leading Chief of the Saskatchewan Plains Cree.
 Edward Ahenakew, Anglican clergyman and author, known for collecting and transcribing cultural stories and tales. As well as advocating for better education for Indigenous people. 
 Fred Sasakamoose, NHL player, first Treaty Indigenous player, who advocated for Indigenous athletes across North America.
 Freda Ahenakew, author, considered a leader in cultural and linguistic preservation of Indigenous language and heritage.
 David Ahenakew, politician, and former National Chief of the Assembly of First Nations. 
 Deborah Chatsis, author.

See also
 List of First Nations governments

References

Cree governments
First Nations governments in Saskatchewan